In organic chemistry, sulfonic acid (or sulphonic acid) refers to a member of the class of organosulfur compounds with the general formula , where R is an organic alkyl or aryl group and the  group a sulfonyl hydroxide. As a substituent, it is known as a sulfo group.  A sulfonic acid can be thought of as sulfuric acid with one hydroxyl group replaced by an organic substituent. The parent compound (with the organic substituent replaced by hydrogen) is the parent sulfonic acid, a tautomer of sulfurous acid, . Salts or esters of sulfonic acids are called sulfonates.

Preparation

Aryl sulfonic acids are produced by the process of sulfonation. Usually the sulfonating agent is sulfur trioxide. A large scale application of this method is the production of alkylbenzenesulfonic acids:
RC6H5 + SO3 -> RC6H4SO3H
In this reaction, sulfur trioxide is an electrophile and the arene is the nucleophile.  The reaction is an example of electrophilic aromatic substitution. 

Alkylsulfonic acids can be prepared by many methods. In in sulfoxidation, alkanes are irradiated with a mixture of sulfur dioxide and oxygen.  This reaction is employed industrially to produce alkyl sulfonic acids, which are used as surfactants.
RH  +  SO2  +  1/2 O2  ->  RSO3H

Direct reaction of alkanes with sulfur trioxide is not generally useful, except for the conversion methanesulfonic acid to methanedisulfonic acid.

Many alkane sulfonic acids can be obtained by the addition of bisulfite to terminal alkenes.  Bisulfite can also be alkylated by alkyl halides:
HSO3- + RCH=CH2  + H+ -> RCH2CH2SO3H
HSO3- + RBr -> RSO3H  +  Br-

Sulfonic acids can be prepared by oxidation of thiols:
RSH + 3/2 O2 -> RSO3H
This pathway is the basis of the biosynthesis of taurine.

Hydrolysis routes
Many sulfonic acids are prepared by hydrolysis of sulfonyl halides and related precursors.  Thus, perfluorooctanesulfonic acid is prepared by hydrolysis of the sulfonyl fluoride, which in turn is generated by the electrofluorination of octanesulfonic acid. Similarly the sulfonyl chloride derived from polyethylene is hydrolyzed to the sulfonic acid.  These sulfonyl chlorides are produced by free-radical reactions of chlorine, sulfur dioxide, and the hydrocarbons using the Reed reaction.

Vinylsulfonic acid is derived by hydrolysis of carbyl sulfate,, which in turn is obtained by the addition of sulfur trioxide to ethylene.

Properties
Sulfonic acids are strong acids.  They are commonly cited as being around a million times stronger than the corresponding carboxylic acid. For example, p-Toluenesulfonic acid and methanesulfonic acid have pKa values of −2.8 and −1.9, respectively, while those of benzoic acid and acetic acid are 4.20 and 4.76, respectively.  However, as a consequence of their strong acidity, their pKa values cannot be measured directly, and values commonly quoted should be regarded as indirect estimates with significant uncertainties. For instance, various sources have reported the pKa of methanesulfonic acid to be as high as −0.6 or as low as −6.5.  Sulfonic acids are known to react with solid sodium chloride (salt) to form the sodium sulfonate and hydrogen chloride.  This property implies an acidity within two or three orders of magnitude of that of HCl(g), whose pKa was recently accurately determined (pKaaq = −5.9).

Because of their polarity, sulfonic acids tend to be crystalline solids or viscous, high-boiling liquids. They are also usually colourless and nonoxidizing, which makes them suitable for use as acid catalysts in organic reactions.  Their polarity, in conjunction with their high acidity, renders short-chain sulfonic acids water-soluble, while longer-chain ones exhibit detergent-like properties.

The structure of sulfonic acids is illustrated by the prototype, methanesulfonic acid. The sulfonic acid group, RSO2OH features a tetrahedral sulfur centre, meaning that sulfur is at the center of four atoms: three oxygens and one carbon. The overall geometry of the sulfur centre is reminiscent of the shape of sulfuric acid.

Applications
Although both alkyl and aryl sulfonic acids are known, most of the applications are associated with the aromatic derivatives.

Detergents and surfactants
Detergents and surfactants are molecules that combine highly nonpolar and highly polar groups. Traditionally, soaps are the popular surfactants, being derived from fatty acids. Since the mid-20th century, the usage of sulfonic acids has surpassed soap in advanced societies. For example, an estimated 2 billion kilograms of alkylbenzenesulfonates are produced annually for diverse purposes. Lignin sulfonates, produced by sulfonation of lignin are components of drilling fluids and additives in certain kinds of concrete.

Dyes
Many if not most of the anthraquinone dyes are produced or processed via sulfonation. Sulfonic acids tend to bind tightly to proteins and carbohydrates. Most "washable" dyes are sulfonic acids (or have the functional sulfonyl group in them) for this reason. p-Cresidinesulfonic acid is used to make food dyes.

Acid catalysts
Being strong acids, sulfonic acids are also used as catalysts. The simplest examples are methanesulfonic acid, CH3SO2OH and p-toluenesulfonic acid, which are regularly used in organic chemistry as acids that are lipophilic (soluble in organic solvents). Polymeric sulfonic acids are also useful. Dowex resin are sulfonic acid derivatives of polystyrene and is used as catalysts and for ion exchange (water softening). Nafion, a fluorinated polymeric sulfonic acid is a component of proton exchange membranes in fuel cells.

Drugs
Sulfa drugs, a class of antibacterials, are produced from sulfonic acids.

Lignosulfonates
In the sulfite process for paper-making, lignin is removed from the lignocellulose by treating wood chips with solutions of sulfite and bisulfite ions.  These reagents cleave the bonds between the cellulose and lignin components and especially within  the lignin itself.  The lignin is converted to lignosulfonates, useful ionomers, which are soluble and can be separated from the cellulose fibers.

Reactions

Hydrolysis

Arylsulfonic acids are susceptible to hydrolysis, the reverse of the sulfonation reaction. Whereas benzenesulfonic acid hydrolyzes above 200 °C, most related derivatives are easier to hydrolyze.  Thus, heating aryl sulfonic acids in aqueous acid produces the parent arene.  This reaction is employed in several scenarios.  In some cases the sulfonic acid serves as a water-solubilizing protecting group, as illustrated by the purification of para-xylene via its sulfonic acid derivative.  In the synthesis of 2,6-dichlorophenol, phenol is converted to its 4-sulfonic acid derivative, which then selectively chlorinates at the positions flanking the phenol.  Hydrolysis releases the sulfonic acid group.

Esterification
Sulfonic acids can be converted to esters. This class of organic compounds has the general formula R−SO2−OR. Sulfonic esters such as methyl triflate are considered good alkylating agents in organic synthesis. Such sulfonate esters are often prepared by alcoholysis of the sulfonyl chlorides:
RSO2Cl + R′OH → RSO2OR′ + HCl

Halogenation
Sulfonyl halide groups occur when a sulfonyl functional group is singly bonded to a halogen atom. They have the general formula R−SO2−X where X is a halide, almost invariably chloride. They are produced by chlorination of sulfonic acids using thionyl chloride and related reagents.

Displacement by hydroxide
Although strong, the (aryl)C−SO3− bond can be broken by nucleophilic reagents. Of historic and continuing significance is the α-sulfonation of anthroquinone followed by displacement of the sulfonate group by other nucleophiles, which cannot be installed directly. An early method for producing phenol involved the base hydrolysis of sodium benzenesulfonate, which can be generated readily from benzene.
C6H5SO3Na + NaOH → C6H5OH + Na2SO3

The conditions for this reaction are harsh, however, requiring 'fused alkali' or molten sodium hydroxide at 350 °C for benzenesulfonic acid itself.  Unlike the mechanism for the fused alkali hydrolysis of chlorobenzene, which proceeds through elimination-addition (benzyne mechanism), benzenesulfonic acid undergoes the analogous conversion by an SNAr mechanism, as revealed by a 14C labeling, despite the lack of stabilizing substituents.  Sulfonic acids with electron-withdrawing groups (e.g., with NO2 or CN substituents) undergo this transformation much more readily.

Notes

References

 
Functional groups